Pseudodinia polita is a species of fly in the family Chamaemyiidae.

References

Chamaemyiidae
Insects described in 1915
Taxa named by John Russell Malloch